Lesia Tsurenko was the defending champion, but lost in the first round to Aleksandra Krunić.

Zhang Shuai won the title for a second time, defeating Krunić in the final, 6–2, 3–6, 6–2.

Seeds

Draw

Finals

Top half

Bottom half

Qualifying

Seeds

Qualifiers

Qualifying draw

First qualifier

Second qualifier

Third qualifier

Fourth qualifier

Fifth qualifier

Sixth qualifier

External links
 Main draw
 Qualifying draw

Guangzhou International Women's Open
Guangzhou International Women's Open
2017 in Chinese tennis